Kevlin Henney is an English author, presenter, and consultant on software development. He has written on the subject of computer programming and development practice for many magazines and sites, including Better Software, The Register, C/C++ Users Journal, Application Development Advisor, JavaSpektrum, C++ Report, Java Report, EXE, and Overload. He is a member of the IEEE Software Advisory Board. Henney is also coauthor of books on patterns and editor of 97 Things Every Programmer Should Know.

Henney has given keynote addresses at a number of conferences, including Agile, ACCU, DevTernity, DevWeek, Dutch PHP Conference, Embedded Systems Club, GeeCON, GOTO, Build Stuff, JAOO, JAZOON, Jfokus, NLUUG, OOP, PHPNW, SDC, Software Architect, VOXXEDDAYS, and XP Day.

Henney is a member of the ACCU, and gave the keynote address at the 2001 ACCU conference on the subject of writing less code, because "there is no code faster than no code" and "less code, equals less bugs" (of which he is an active presenter). He is also a speaker at OOPSLA, most recently speaking at OOPSLA 2005. In October 2009, Henney presented The Uncertainty Principle at the 2nd Annual PHP North West Conference in Manchester, UK. He has also been credited with the remark "...except for the problem of too many layers of indirection" in response to the famous aphorism of David Wheeler: "All problems in computer science can be solved by another level of indirection."

Bibliography

References

External links 
 

British technology writers
Living people
British software engineers
Year of birth missing (living people)